Maayan Strauss (born in 1982 in Jerusalem) is an Israeli artist.

Strauss studied architecture at the Bezalel Academy of Arts and Design in Jerusalem. She has exhibited in several galleries and art projects, such as the project "Sharon", that suggests, according to curator Joshua Simon, "an unlikely connection between the most affluent region in Israel, and the name of the Israeli PM."

Maayan Strauss studied at the Yale Photography MFA and graduated in 2012.

Exhibitions & Projects

In 2003 she showed paintings and photographs in Tel Aviv's renowned  Givon Gallery.

In 2005, Strauss was involved in the short film Beautiful Tamar as the narrator.

In 2006, she exhibited a work called "Settlement Evacuation" in the Israel Museum of Jerusalem as part of the "Mini Israel" exhibition that the museum held. Strauss's work was a model of a Jewish settlement being evacuated.

The work was followed by debates of political nature in the Israeli press and parliament..

In May, 2006, Strauss curated with Roy Arad and Joshua Simon the exhibition Doron (present in Hebrew) at the Minshar Gallery in Tel Aviv.

Other exhibitions followed and her works were bought by major collectors of Israeli art.

2007 The Herzliya Biennial.

2008 “Internazionale!”, group exhibition, Left Bank Gallery, Tel Aviv, September

2008 “Family", Project at “Mix-Art Festival”, Rishon Le-Zion park, April

2008 "Treasure", group exhibition, GDK Gallery, Berlin, October

2009 “Artist at Work”, group exhibition, Left Bank Gallery, Tel Aviv, May

2009 "Sweethearts", Project at “Fresh paint Art Fair” Tel Aviv, March

2010 "Correspondences", group exhibition, Yafo 23, Jerusalem, Oct-Nov

The Art & Poetry magazine "Maayan" was named after her, and she was one of the contributors to articles as a co-founder
& editor.

The artist currently resides in New York.

References

External links
"Mini Israel" Exhibition website
The Doron exhibition (Hebrew-English)

The Fountainhead (כמעיין המתגבר) -  Works paintings & Interview by E. Boganim
http://maayanstrauss.com/ 

Israeli artists
Israeli curators
Israeli women artists
1982 births
Living people
Bezalel Academy of Arts and Design alumni
Yale School of Art alumni
People from Jerusalem
Israeli women curators